SSI may refer to:

Companies 
 Sahaviriya Steel Industries, Thai steel company
 Samsung Semiconductor Inc., a Korean electronics company
 Space Services Inc., a team of companies investigating new commercial opportunities in space
 Strategic Simulations Inc, computer gaming company that produced war and simulation games from the mid-1980s to late 1990s.
 Survey Sampling International, a global provider of sampling solutions in marketing research program
 SSI Group, a healthcare revenue cycle company; see Rosa Lavín

Computing 
 Serializable snapshot isolation, a way to allow multiple concurrent transactions to see consistent information when making changes to a database
 Server Side Includes, a server-side scripting language used on the Web
 Self-sovereign identity, the user has a means of generating and controlling unique identifiers as well as some facility to store identity data.
 Shared Source Initiative, a source-available software licensing scheme by Microsoft
 Simple Sensor Interface protocol, a simple communications protocol designed for smart sensors
 Single sign-in, or single sign-on, a specialized form of software authentication
 Single system image, a cluster dedicated operating system
 Small-scale integration, a type of integrated circuit
 Solid State Intelligence, a malevolent entity described by John C. Lilly
 Synchronous Serial Interface, a serial interface standard for industrial applications

Economics and government 
 Standing settlement instructions, payment processing and settlement information about financial institutions
 Strategic sustainable investing, an investment strategy that recognizes financial value in transitional leadership towards sustainability
 Supplemental Security Income, a United States federal government program

Medicine 
 Stress-strain index, a measure of bone strength
 Surgical site infection
Sliding scale insulin

Military and police 
 Selective Service Initiative, a form of military conscription in the United States
 Senior station inspector, a rank in the Singapore Police Force
 Shoulder sleeve insignia, formation insignia used by the United States Army
 Soldier Support Institute, a U.S. Army organization 
 Staff Sergeant Instructor, an appointment in the British Army
 State Security Investigations Service, former Egyptian agency
 Strategic Studies Institute, the United States Army War College institute for geostrategic and national security research and analysis
 A submarine classification type, used by the US Navy, standing for Attack Submarine (Diesel Air-Independent Propulsion)
 Subsecretaria de Inteligência, the Brazilian intelligence agency until 1995

Organizations 
 Sano Sansar Initiative, a global youth organization
 Scuba Schools International, a diver training organization
 Software Sustainability Institute, a UK-based, academic software organisation
 Space Science Institute, an American nonprofit organisation based in Boulder, Colorado
 Space Studies Institute, an American non-profit organization based in Mojave, California
 The Spastics Society of India, former name of ADAPT – Able Disable All People Together, an organization based in India
 Spatial Sciences Institute, a professional body in the Asia-Pacific region
 Statens Serum Institut, the Danish State Serum Institute
 Statens strålskyddsinstitut (Swedish Radiation Safety Authority), a Stockholm-based regulatory and research government agency
 Students Supporting Israel, a network of pro-Israel student organizations in North America and the United Kingdom
 Swedish Society for Interlingua, a society that encourages the active use of Interlingua in Sweden

Science and engineering 
 Socio-scientific issues, controversial social issues which relate to science
 Soil structure interaction, the interaction between soil and structures (e.g. buildings), especially in seismic engineering
 Solid State Interlocking, the brand name of a railway signalling system developed in the 1980s in the UK
 Solid state ionics, the study of ionic-electronic and ionic conductors (solid electrolytes) and their uses
 Solid State Ionics, a peer-reviewed scientific journal dedicated to the topic
 SteadyShot Inside, a sensor-based camera image stabilization system by Sony

Others 
 Scottish Statutory Instrument, a form of secondary or subordinate legislation in Scotland
 Sensitive Security Information, a category of sensitive information under the United States government's information sharing and control rules
 St. Simons Island, a barrier island on the coast of Georgia, United States
 Star of the Solomon Islands, the most senior award made by the government of the Solomon Islands
 Sustainable Society Index, a tool for assessing the sustainability of 151 assessed countries
 Semmangudi Srinivasa Iyer, Indian singer